Jinzhou Station or Jinzhou railway station may refer to the following in China:

Jinzhou station (Guangzhou Metro) (金洲站), station of the Guangzhou Metro in Guangzhou, Guangdong
Jinzhou railway station (Jinzhou) (锦州站), in Jinzhou, Liaoning
Jinzhou South railway station (锦州南站), in Jinzhou, Liaoning
Jinzhou railway station (Dalian) (金州站), in Jinzhou District, Dalian, Liaoning